Sohung South Airport(서흥비행장) is an airport in Hwanghae-bukto, North Korea.

Facilities 
The airfield has a single grass runway 18/36 measuring 2800 x 154 feet (853 x 47 m).

References 

Airports in North Korea
North Hwanghae